A family of some 200 Remote Oceanic languages has traditionally been posited as a subgroup of the Central-Eastern Oceanic languages. However, it was abandoned by Lynch, Ross, & Crowley in 2002, as no defining features of the family could be found.

Languages
Its components are:

Central Pacific languages
Eastern Outer Islands languages
Loyalty Islands languages
Micronesian languages
New Caledonian languages
North and Central Vanuatu languages

References
 Lynch, John, Malcolm Ross & Terry Crowley. (2002). The Oceanic languages. Richmond, Surrey: Curzon Press.

See also
Oceanic languages
Remote Oceania

Oceanic languages
Central–Eastern Oceanic languages